Kelardasht-e Sharqi Rural District is a rural district (dehestan) in Kelardasht District, Chalus County, Mazandaran Province, Iran. At the 2006 census, its population was 3,103, in 916 families. The rural district had 8 villages.

References 

Rural Districts of Mazandaran Province
Chalus County